The 2016 Stroud District Council election took place on 5 May 2016 to elect members of Stroud District Council in England. This was on the same day as other local elections. Due to boundary changes, all seats were up for election, with the council moving to a four-year election cycle.

Results Summary

A total of 181 ballots were rejected, and the overall turnout was 42.59%.

Ward results

Amberley & Woodchester

Berkeley Vale

Bisley

Cainscross

Cam East

Cam West

Chalford

Coaley & Uley

Dursley

Hardwicke

Kingswood

Minchinhampton

Nailsworth

Painswick & Upton

Randwick, Whiteshill & Ruscombe

Rodborough

Severn

Stonehouse

Stroud Central

Stroud Farmhill & Paganhill

Stroud Slade

Stroud Trinity

Stroud Uplands

Stroud Valley

The Stanleys

Thrupp

Wotton-under-Edge

References

2016 English local elections
2016
2010s in Gloucestershire